SS Dorothy Phillips was a 2,119-ton cargo ship that was attacked during World War II. The  fired at her on December 24, 1941. Dorothy Phillips was damaged in the attack off the coast of Monterey, California. In the attack the ship's rudder was damaged and the ship could not steer and ran aground. Dorothy Phillips was built in 1918 by Albina Engine and Machine Works in Portland, Oregon. Dorothy Phillips was built by Albina Engine & Machine Works in a shipyard along the Willamette River in Portland, Oregon, United States. Dorothy Phillips was produced as a freighters for World War I as Point Loma. In 1937 she was sold and renamed Dorothy Phillips. In 1946 she was sold and renamed Karen Olson. In 1957 she was sold and renamed Rio Tigre. In 1962 she was scrapped.

See also
 Attack on Pearl Harbor
 List of shipwrecks in 1941
 California during World War II

References

External links
 Media related to Albina Engine & Machine Works at the Oregon Historical Society

1917 ships
Maritime incidents in December 1941
United States home front during World War II
Ships built in Portland, Oregon
Merchant ships of the United States